Gilt-edged securities are bonds issued by the UK Government. The term is of British origin, and then referred to the debt securities issued by the Bank of England on behalf of His Majesty's Treasury, whose paper certificates had a gilt (or gilded) edge. Hence, they are known as gilt-edged securities, or gilts for short.

In 2002, the data collected by the British Office for National Statistics revealed that about two-thirds of all UK gilts are held by insurance companies and pension funds. Since 2009 large quantities of gilts have been created and repurchased by the Bank of England under its policy of quantitative easing, and in recent years overseas investors have also been attracted to gilts by their "safe haven" status.

Nomenclature 
In his 2019 book about the gilt market from 1928 to 1972, William A. Allen described gilt-edged securities as "long‐duration liabilities of the UK government" that were traded on the London Stock Exchange

Today, the term "gilt-edged security" or simply "gilt" is used in the United Kingdom as well as some Commonwealth nations, such as South Africa and India. However, when reference is made to "gilts", what is generally meant is UK gilts, unless otherwise specified. Colloquially, the term "gilt-edged" is sometimes used to denote high-grade securities, consequently carrying low yields, as opposed to relatively riskier, below investment-grade securities.

Gilt-edged market makers (GEMMs) are banks or securities houses registered with the Bank of England which have certain obligations, such as taking part in gilt auctions.

The term "gilt account" is also a term used by the Reserve Bank of India to refer to a constituent account maintained by a custodian bank for maintenance and servicing of dematerialized government securities owned by a retail customer.

History 
Following the 1688 Glorious Revolution, with the founding in 1694 of the Bank of England by Royal Charter, King William III borrowed £1,200,000 from the bank's 1,268 private subscribers to bank stock in order to fund the war with France. This marked the inception of what became a permanent or perpetual national public debt with the Stock Exchange dealing in UK government securities. The Bank of England's debt securities were published as certificates with gilded edges.

The next major public debt incurred by the government was the South Sea Bubble of 1720. British citizens continued to pay interest on that debt in 2014, when low interest rates led George Osborne, then the chancellor of the Exchequer to pay off the remaining loan.

In 1927, then chancellor of the Exchequer, Winston Churchill issued 4% consols or securities, in part to refinance World War I National War Bonds originating from World War I. In 2014, when they were to be repaid, these consols were valued at £218 million.

The government sells bonds in order to raise the money it needs, like an IOU to be paid back at a future datefrom five to thirty yearswith interest. This form of government borrowing proved successful and became a common way to fund wars and later infrastructure projects when tax revenue was not sufficient to cover their costs. Many of the early issues were perpetual, having no fixed maturity date. These were issued under various names but were later generally referred to as Consols.

Britain' Pensions Regulator warned trustees responsible for British defined benefit pension funds that the decrease in the price of gilts and the sharp rise in gilt yields could "trigger a scramble for cash" as "spooked" international financial markets responded to the fiscal policy announced by their new Prime Minister, Liz Truss. The September 2022 United Kingdom mini-budget, introduced in a 23 September statement by Kwasi Kwarteng, Britain's new chancellor, was described by The Economist as "fiscally and politically...reckless". It included £45bn of unfunded tax cuts, as well as energy bill assistance, with no corresponding expenditure reductions to fund the cuts and supports. In response, on 27 September, the value of the pound sterling plunged in foreign exchange markets, reaching a record low against the United States dollar. Yields on long term gilts spiked by 325% in 2022 with yields on 10-year gilts increasing to over 4%its highest interest rate since 2008. Final salary pension schemes hedged with liability-driven investment (LDI) strategies, represented the groups most directly impacted by the massive, unexpected sale of gilts. As the price of gilts held by these funds as assets decreased, trustees were forced to race for cash. These pension schemes hedged with LDI to "ensure their ability to make future payments" but LDI strategies are "very sensitive to fast-moving gilt yields". Of the £2.5 trillion in final salary pension schemes, most use LDI funds to match their liabilities to millions of pensioners with future income. By September 2022, the LDI market totaled approximately £1.6 trillion, according to a Reuters report. With soaring yields on bonds, the government's borrowing costs to finance its policies increasedas did its long term public debt.  In the race for cash, pension funds had to slash positions. As pension trustees sold off gilts, the Bank of England (BOE), which is independent from the British government, took emergency action on 28 September by initiating a two-week £65 billion long-term gilt buy-back programme in an effort to stabilise financial markets and to halt a crisis in the broader economy. By October 11, after the Bank of England's governor, Andrew Bailey, warned that the BOE would not extend the emergency purchases beyond the two week period, the pound fell sharply against the US dollar.In August, the BOE had raised concerns that the rising cost of both energy and food, could push inflation even higher than 10.1%a 40-year record reached in Julyand could trigger a 2022 recession. The BOE delayed a large emergency interest rate increase until the November budget. Britain's flexible exchange rate along with the fact that its public debt in foreign currencies is minimal, provides some protection. In a rare public rebuke of the policies, the International Monetary Fund (IMF) called on Britain to  revise the proposed cuts by targeting relief to the poorest households to avoid "stoking inequality." Moody's, the credit rating agency used by large investors to monitor credit worthiness of nations, cautioned that if the market's loss of confidence in the UK's fiscal strategy was sustained, the result could be "structurally higher funding costs" that "could more permanently weaken the UK's debt affordability." Moody's commentary, which was also critical of the policies, said that these "large unfunded" "fiscal stimulus" and tax cuts would result in increased borrowing costs which would weigh down growth in the medium term.

Conventional gilts 
These are the simplest form of UK government bond and make up the largest share of the gilt portfolio (75% as of October 2016). A conventional gilt is a bond issued by the UK government which pays the holder a fixed cash payment (or coupon) every six months until maturity, at which point the holder receives their final coupon payment and the return of the principal.

Coupon rate
Conventional gilts are denoted by their coupon rate and maturity year, e.g. % Treasury Gilt 2055. The coupon paid on the gilt typically reflects the market rate of interest at the time of issue of the gilt, and indicates the cash payment per £100 that the holder will receive each year, split into two payments in March and September.

Gilt names
Historically, gilt names referred to their purpose of issuance, or signified how a stock had been created, such as % Conversion Stock 1999; or different names were used for different gilts simply to minimise confusion between them. In more recent times, gilts have been generally named Treasury Stocks. Since 2005–2006, all new issues of gilts have been called Treasury Gilts.

Trends
The most noticeable trends in the gilt market in recent years have been:
 A substantial and persistent decline in market yields as the currency has stabilised compared to the 1970s and more recently UK gilts are seen as a safe haven compared to certain other government bonds.
 A decline in coupons: several gilts were issued in the 1970s and 1980s with coupons of ≥10% per annum, but these have now matured.
 A large and prolonged increase in the overall volume of issuance as the public sector borrowing requirement has increased. 
 An increase in the volume of issuance of very long dated gilts to respond to demand for these.
 A large volume of gilts have been repurchased by central government under its quantitative easing programme.

Index-linked gilts 

These account for around a quarter of UK government debt within the gilt market. The UK was one of the first developed economies to issue index-linked bonds in 27 March 1981. Initially only tax-exempt pension funds were allowed to hold these bonds. The UK has issued around 20 index-linked bonds since then. Like conventional gilts, index-linked gilts pay coupons which are initially set in line with market interest rates. However, their semi-annual coupons and principal payment are adjusted in line with movements in the General Index of Retail Prices (RPI).

Ultra-long index-linked bonds, maturing in 2062 and 2068, were issued in October 2011 and September 2013 respectively, and a 2065 maturity is due to be issued in February 2016.

Indexation lag
As with all index-linked bonds, there are time lags between the collection of prices data, the publication of the inflation index and the indexation of the bond. From their introduction in 1981, index-linked gilts had an eight-month indexation lag (between the month of collection of prices data and the month of indexation of the bond). This was so that the amount of the next coupon was known at the start of each six-month interest accrual period.  However, in 2005 the UK Debt Management Office announced that all new issues of index-linked gilts would use a three-month indexation lag, first used in the Canadian Real Return Bond market, and the majority of index-linked gilts now in issue are structured on that basis.

Double-dated gilts 
In the past, the UK government issued many double-dated gilts, which had a range of maturity dates at the option of the government. The last remaining such stock was redeemed in December 2013.

Green gilts 
In September 2021, the UK held its inaugural "green gilt" sale, which was met with record demand. Investors placing over £100bn in bids. The UK's Debt Management Office (DMO) plans to sell £15bn of green gilts this year. The 12-year bond will mature in July 2033, and is priced at a yield of about 0.9 percent. The money raised by the bonds are earmarked for environmental spending, such as on projects including flood defences, renewable energy, or carbon capture and storage.

Undated gilts

Historical undated gilts
Until late 2014 there existed eight undated gilts, which made up a very small proportion of the UK government's debt. They had no fixed maturity date. These gilts were very old: some, such as Consols, dated from the 18th century. The largest, War Loan, was issued in the early 20th century. The redemption (payout of the principal) of these bonds was at the discretion of the UK government, but because of their age, they all had low coupons, and so for a long time there was little incentive for the government to redeem them. Because the outstanding amounts were relatively very small, there was a very limited market in most of these gilts. In late 2014 and early 2015 the government gave notice that four of these gilts, including War Loan, would be redeemed in early 2015. The last four remaining gilts, with coupons of 2.5% or 2.75%, were redeemed on 5 July 2015.

Proposed new undated gilts
In May 2012 the UK Debt Management Office issued a consultation document which raised the possibility of issuing new undated gilts, but there was little support for this proposal.

Gilt strips 
Many gilts can be "stripped" into their individual cash flows, namely Interest (the periodic coupon payments) and Principal (the ultimate repayment of the investment) which can be traded separately as zero-coupon gilts, or gilt strips. For example, a ten-year gilt can be stripped to make 21 separate securities:
20 strips based on the coupons, which are entitled to just one of the half-yearly interest payments; and one strip entitled to the redemption payment at the end of the ten years. The title "Separately Traded and Registered Interest and Principal Securities" was created as a reverse acronym for "strips".

The UK gilt strip market started in December 1997. Gilts can be reconstituted from all of the individual strips. By the end of 2001, there were 11 strippable gilts in issue in the UK totalling £1,800 million.

Maturity of gilts 
The maturity of gilts is defined by the UK Debt Management Office (DMO) is as follows: short, 0–7 years; medium, 7–15 years; and long, more than 15 years.

Gilts with a term to maturity of less than three years are also referred to as "ultra short", while the new gilts issued since 2005 with a term to maturity of 50 years or more have been referred to as "ultra long".

See also
 List of government bonds

References

Government bonds
United Kingdom national debt